Gerald Allan Cohen,  (14 April 1941 – 5 August 2009) was a Canadian political philosopher who held the positions of Quain Professor of Jurisprudence, University College London and Chichele Professor of Social and Political Theory, All Souls College, Oxford. He was known for his work on Marxism, and later, egalitarianism and distributive justice in normative political philosophy.

Life and career 
Born into a communist Jewish family in Montreal, Quebec, on 14 April 1941, Cohen was educated at McGill University (BA, philosophy and political science) in his hometown and the University of Oxford (BPhil, philosophy), where he studied under Gilbert Ryle (and was also taught by Isaiah Berlin). 

Cohen was assistant lecturer (1963–1964), lecturer (1964–1979), then reader (1979–1984) in the Department of Philosophy at University College London, before being appointed to the Chichele chair at Oxford in 1985. Several of his students, such as Christopher Bertram, Simon Caney, Alan Carter, Cécile Fabre, Will Kymlicka, John McMurtry, David Leopold, Michael Otsuka, Seana Shiffrin, and Jonathan Wolff went on to be important moral and political philosophers, while another, Ricky Gervais, has a successful career in comedy.

Known as a proponent of analytical Marxism and a founding member of the September Group, Cohen's 1978 work Karl Marx's Theory of History: A Defence defends an interpretation of Karl Marx's historical materialism often called technological determinism by its critics. In Self-Ownership, Freedom, and Equality, Cohen offers an extensive moral argument in favour of socialism, contrasting his views with those of John Rawls and Robert Nozick, by articulating an extensive critique of the Lockean principle of self-ownership as well as the use of that principle to defend right as well as left-libertarianism. In If You're an Egalitarian, How Come You're So Rich? (which covers the topic of his Gifford Lectures), Cohen addresses the question of what egalitarian political principles imply for the personal behaviour of those who hold them.

Cohen was close friends with Marxist political philosopher Marshall Berman.

Cohen died on 5 August 2009.

Works
Karl Marx's Theory of History: A Defence (1978, 2000)
History, Labour, and Freedom (1988)
 
If You're an Egalitarian, How Come You're So Rich? (2000)
"Expensive Taste Rides Again," in: Ronald Dworkin and his Critics, with replies by Dworkin (2004)
Rescuing Justice and Equality (2008)
Why Not Socialism? (2009) [Trad. esp.: ¿Por qué no el socialismo?, Buenos Aires/Madrid, Katz editores, 2011, ]
On the Currency of Egalitarian Justice, and Other Essays in Political Philosophy (2011)
Finding Oneself in the Other (2012)
Lectures on the History of Moral and Political Philosophy (2013)

See also

Luck egalitarianism

References

Further reading
The Egalitarian Conscience: Essays in Honour of G. A. Cohen (2006); edited by Christine Sypnowich

External links

 Socialist Studies Special Edition on the Life and Work of G.A. Cohen
 Imprints interview
 Cohen's Tanner Lectures: "Incentives, Inequality, and Community" 
 Cohen interview at Philosophy Bites (mp3 audio)
 Obituary to Gerald Cohen at The Third Estate
 Obituary in The Monthly Review
Obituary in The Times Archived by Wayback Machine
 Obituary in The Guardian
 Obituary in The Independent
 Remembering Jerry Cohen: A Tribute in Socialist Worker 
 Review of Why Not Socialism? in The Oxonian Review
 Journal of Ethics volume for Jerry Cohen
 
Jerry Cohen – an Appreciation  by Michael Rosen
2010 All Souls College Commemoration of Gerald (Jerry) Allan Cohen with addresses from Professors Philippe Van Parijs, John Roemer, Myles Burnyeat and Timothy Scanlon, and a family tribute from Jerry's son Gideon Cohen.
UCL News Obituary: Professor Jerry Cohen Professor Stephen Guest of UCL Laws writes in memory.
Michael Otsuka’s remarks at Jerry Cohen’s funeral All Souls College Chapel, 11 August 2009 

1941 births
2009 deaths
20th-century Canadian philosophers
21st-century Canadian philosophers
Academics of University College London
Alumni of New College, Oxford
Anglophone Quebec people
British Jews
British Marxists
British political philosophers
Canadian Marxists
Canadian political philosophers
Chichele Professors of Social and Political Theory
Critics of dialectical materialism
Fellows of All Souls College, Oxford
Fellows of the British Academy
Jewish Canadian writers
Jewish philosophers
Jewish socialists
Marxist theorists
McGill University alumni
Scholars of Marxism
Deutscher Memorial Prize winners
Writers from Montreal
Locke scholars